Jungle crow is a common name that refers to three species of crow. Initially thought to be a single species, the group has since been split into the following species:

 Large-billed crow, Corvus macrorhynchos
 Eastern jungle crow, Corvus levaillantii
 Indian jungle crow, Corvus culminatus

Birds by common name